Warren Township is a township in Franklin County, Pennsylvania, United States. The population was 328 at the 2020 census.

History
Warren Township has the name of Joseph Warren, American soldier and doctor.

Yeakle's Mill Bridge was listed on the National Register of Historic Places in 1988.

Geography
The township occupies the southwestern corner of Franklin County, bordered to the west by Fulton County and to the south by Washington County in the state of Maryland. The western boundary of the township follows the crest of Tuscarora Mountain as far as its southern end, and the eastern boundary follows the crest of Cove Mountain. The southern boundary is the Mason–Dixon line.

The settled part of the township occupies the space between the two mountains, known as Little Cove Valley, drained to the south by Little Cove Creek, a tributary of Licking Creek, which flows south across Maryland to the Potomac River. Pennsylvania Route 456 runs the length of the township through the valley, leading north to Pennsylvania Route 16 in Peters Township, and continuing south in Maryland as unnumbered Hollow Road to Interstate 70 at the Potomac River.

Neighboring Townships

  Ayr Township (Fulton County), (northwest) 
  Montgomery Township (east)
  Peters Township (northeast)
  Thompson Township (Fulton County), (west)

Communities

  Sylvan
  Yeakle Mill

Demographics

As of the census of 2000, there were 334 people, 131 households, and 104 families residing in the township.  The population density was 10.9 people per square mile (4.2/km2).  There were 148 housing units at an average density of 4.8/sq mi (1.9/km2).  The racial makeup of the township was 98.20% White, 0.30% African American, 0.30% from other races, and 1.20% from two or more races. Hispanic or Latino of any race were 0.60% of the population.

There were 131 households, out of which 32.1% had children under the age of 18 living with them, 72.5% were married couples living together, 2.3% had a female householder with no husband present, and 20.6% were non-families. 19.1% of all households were made up of individuals, and 12.2% had someone living alone who was 65 years of age or older.  The average household size was 2.55 and the average family size was 2.87.

In the township the population was spread out, with 23.1% under the age of 18, 5.1% from 18 to 24, 32.3% from 25 to 44, 24.3% from 45 to 64, and 15.3% who were 65 years of age or older.  The median age was 38 years. For every 100 females there were 107.5 males.  For every 100 females age 18 and over, there were 105.6 males.

The median income for a household in the township was $39,375, and the median income for a family was $52,917. Males had a median income of $36,250 versus $19,688 for females. The per capita income for the township was $19,296.  About 2.0% of families and 2.1% of the population were below the poverty line, including none of those under age 18 and 4.1% of those age 65 or over.

References

Populated places established in 1798
Townships in Franklin County, Pennsylvania